Michael Wayne Pyle (born September 18, 1975) is a retired American professional mixed martial artist who competed in the welterweight division of the UFC. A professional competitor since 1999, Pyle is a former WEC Welterweight Champion, and has also competed in Strikeforce, Elite XC, Affliction, M-1 Global, and for the Los Angeles Anacondas of the IFL.

Background
Pyle was born and raised in Dresden, Tennessee until the age of 17 when he moved to Birmingham, Alabama. It was there that he began studying Taekwondo. One of his training partners told him, "Man you gotta check out this cage fighter stuff they got going on. There's this guy who lays on the ground and breaks peoples arms ..." The cage fighting they were talking about was the UFC. The man they were talking about was Royce Gracie, the masterful practitioner of the martial arts discipline known as Brazilian jiu-jitsu who won the tournaments at UFC 1, UFC 2 and UFC 4. Pyle created a gym in a 13 x 15-foot shed behind his mother's home in Dresden, searching for any instructional videos for Brazilian jiu-jitsu he could get his hands on as well attending seminars put together by the Gracie family, whenever they were close enough for him to make the drive. Despite having no formal Brazilian jiu-jitsu training, Pyle would go on to be a successful submission grappler in mixed martial arts, the large majority of his wins coming by submission.

Mixed martial arts career

Early career
Pyle's first sanctioned amateur MMA fight was in 1999 against future UFC Light Heavyweight Champion Quinton Jackson. The bout was on ISCF MMA & IKF Kickboxing Promoter Jeff Mullen's November 13 event at the New Daisey Theatre in Memphis, Tennessee, (Jackson's hometown). Pyle and Jackson were to be the Main Event and was supposed to be for the ISCF Amateur Mid-South Regional Middleweight Title. However, Jackson weighed in 25 lbs heavy (200 lb.) for the title so technically, Pyle (175 lb.) won by forfeit. But this could not keep these two from going for it in the ring. The young Pyle, who tried various different submissions during the fight, was thrown and slammed several times, at one point being actually throw out of the ring by the future PRIDE veteran. In the end, Jackson won by unanimous decision but Pyle, who had also fought with two broken fingers, felt that he had won and was quick to ask for a rematch. From this fight, Pyle learned that "just jiu-jitsu wasn't going to be able to cut it."

World Extreme Cagefighting
On October 14, 2005, Pyle became the WEC Welterweight Champion by defeating Bret Bergmark. He successfully defended the title against veteran Shonie Carter on January 13, 2006. He defeated Carter by triangle choke submission in the first round.

Pyle then left the WEC for the IFL and was stripped of the title in December 2006.

The IFL and Affliction
Pyle fought three times in the IFL fights as a member of Bas Rutten’s Los Angeles Anacondas. He also fought for Elite XC, Strikeforce, and he was featured on the preliminary card of the first event co-promoted by Affliction Clothing and Adrenaline MMA: Affliction: Banned.

Ultimate Fighting Championship
Pyle then signed with the UFC as a replacement for Chris Wilson, fighting Brock Larson at UFC 98. Pyle took the fight on just one week's notice. Pyle lost in the first round via arm-triangle choke.

Next, he fought and defeated Wilson at UFC Fight Night: Diaz vs. Guillard by submission due to a guillotine choke in the third round.
  
Pyle was defeated by Jake Ellenberger via second round TKO on January 2, 2010 at UFC 108.

Pyle defeated Jesse Lennox at UFC 115 on June 12, 2010. Pyle largely controlled the bout and won via technical submission, when his opponent passed out in a triangle choke late in the third round.

Pyle gave John Hathaway his first professional MMA loss via unanimous decision on October 16, 2010 at UFC 120, replacing an injured Dong Hyun Kim. He controlled the fight for all three rounds, out-striking and out-grappling Hathaway, even going as far as putting Hathaway in a modified crucifix-triangle choke hold and raining down unanswered strikes.

Pyle faced Ricardo Almeida on March 19, 2011 at UFC 128. Pyle won the fight via unanimous decision (29-28, 29-28, 29-28).

Pyle next faced Rory MacDonald on August 6, 2011 at UFC 133. He lost the fight via TKO in the first round.

Pyle was expected to face Paulo Thiago on January 14, 2012 at UFC 142. However, Thiago was forced out of the bout with an injury and replaced by Ricardo Funch. Pyle won the bout via TKO in the first round.

Pyle faced Josh Neer on June 8, 2012 at UFC on FX 3. Pyle defeated Neer via first round KO, earning Knockout of the Night honors.

Pyle was then matched up against James Head on December 15, 2012 at The Ultimate Fighter: Team Carwin vs. Team Nelson Finale. He won the fight via TKO in the first round.

Pyle was expected to face Gunnar Nelson on May 25, 2013 at UFC 160.  However, Nelson pulled out of the bout citing an injury and was replaced by Rick Story. Although he got knocked down in the end of the first round, Pyle withstood Story's attack and recovered in the second round, coming close to submitting his opponent with a kimura. In the third round Pyle came on strong, landing numerous knees and elbows and hurting Story.  Pyle won the fight via split decision.

Pyle next faced Matt Brown on August 17, 2013 at UFC Fight Night 26. Brown defeated Pyle via first round knockout.

Pyle faced TJ Waldburger on February 22, 2014 at UFC 170. He won via TKO in the third round, after hurting Waldburger with two elbows and a knee.

Pyle was expected to face Demian Maia on August 23, 2014 at UFC Fight Night 49. However, Maia pulled out of the fight with an injury and was replaced by Jordan Mein. He lost the fight via TKO in the first round.

Pyle was expected to face Sean Spencer on May 23, 2015 at UFC 187.  However, on April 23, Spencer pulled out of the fight with an undisclosed injury and was replaced by Colby Covington.  Pyle lost the fight via unanimous decision.

The bout with Spencer was rescheduled and eventually took place on February 6, 2016 at UFC Fight Night 82. Pyle won the back-and-forth fight via TKO in the third round, after landing a spinning elbow and following up with punches, elbows and knees.  Pyle was also awarded his first Fight of the Night bonus award.

Pyle next faced Alberto Mina on July 7, 2016 at UFC Fight Night 90. He lost the fight via knockout in the second round.

Pyle faced Alex Garcia on December 30, 2016 at UFC 207. He lost the fight by knockout in the first round.

Pyle faced Zak Ottow on March 3, 2018 at UFC 222. He lost the fight via TKO in the first round. Pyle retired from MMA competition after this fight.

Personal life
Pyle and his girlfriend were married in October 2009.

Pyle played the role of Capt. Kevin Burke in the movie Universal Soldier: Regeneration starring Jean-Claude Van Damme, Dolph Lundgren and fellow MMA fighter Andrei Arlovski.

Pyle played a small part in the 2012 blockbuster Men In Black III starring Will Smith and Tommy Lee Jones.

After the retirement from competition, Pyle has been working as an assistant coach at his long-time team Syndicate MMA in Las Vegas.

Championships and accomplishments
Ultimate Fighting Championship
Fight of the Night (One time)
Knockout of the Night (One time)
World Extreme Cagefighting
WEC Welterweight Championship (One time)
One successful title defense
Viking Fight
Viking Fight Middleweight Championship (One time)

Mixed martial arts record

|- 
|Loss
|align=center|27–14–1
|Zak Ottow
|TKO (punches)
|UFC 222 
|
|align=center|1
|align=center|2:34
|Las Vegas, Nevada, United States
|
|- 
|Loss
|align=center|27–13–1
|Alex Garcia
|KO (punch)
|UFC 207
|
|align=center|1
|align=center|3:34
|Las Vegas, Nevada, United States
| 
|-
|Loss
|align=center|27–12–1
|Alberto Mina
|KO (flying knee and punches)
|UFC Fight Night: dos Anjos vs. Alvarez
|
|align=center|2
|align=center|1:17
|Las Vegas, Nevada, United States
| 
|-
|Win
|align=center|27–11–1
|Sean Spencer
|TKO (elbows and knees)
|UFC Fight Night: Hendricks vs. Thompson
|
|align=center|3
|align=center|4:25
|Las Vegas, Nevada, United States
|
|-
|Loss
|align=center|26–11–1
|Colby Covington
|Decision (unanimous)
|UFC 187
|
|align=center|3
|align=center|5:00
|Las Vegas, Nevada, United States
|
|-
| Loss
| align=center| 
| Jordan Mein
| TKO (punches)
| UFC Fight Night: Henderson vs. dos Anjos
| 
| align=center| 1
| align=center| 1:12
| Tulsa, Oklahoma, United States
| 
|-
| Win
| align=center| 26–9–1
| TJ Waldburger
| TKO (elbows and punches)
| UFC 170
| 
| align=center| 3
| align=center| 4:03
| Las Vegas, Nevada, United States
| 
|-
| Loss
| align=center| 25–9–1
| Matt Brown
| KO (punches)
| UFC Fight Night: Shogun vs. Sonnen
| 
| align=center| 1
| align=center| 0:29
| Boston, Massachusetts, United States
| 
|-
| Win
| align=center| 25–8–1
| Rick Story
| Decision (split)
| UFC 160
| 
| align=center| 3
| align=center| 5:00
| Las Vegas, Nevada, United States
| 
|-
| Win
| align=center| 24–8–1
| James Head
| TKO (knee and punches)
| The Ultimate Fighter: Team Carwin vs. Team Nelson Finale
| 
| align=center| 1
| align=center| 1:55
| Las Vegas, Nevada, United States
| 
|-
| Win
| align=center| 23–8–1
| Josh Neer
| KO (punch)
| UFC on FX: Johnson vs. McCall
| 
| align=center| 1
| align=center| 4:56
| Sunrise, Florida, United States
| 
|-
| Win
| align=center| 22–8–1
| Ricardo Funch
| TKO (knee and punches)
| UFC 142
| 
| align=center| 1
| align=center| 1:22
| Rio de Janeiro, Brazil
| 
|-
| Loss
| align=center| 21–8–1
| Rory MacDonald
| TKO (punches)
| UFC 133
| 
| align=center| 1
| align=center| 3:54
| Philadelphia, Pennsylvania, United States
| 
|-
| Win
| align=center| 21–7–1
| Ricardo Almeida
| Decision (unanimous)
| UFC 128
| 
| align=center| 3
| align=center| 5:00
| Newark, New Jersey, United States
| 
|-
| Win
| align=center| 20–7–1
| John Hathaway
| Decision (unanimous)
| UFC 120
| 
| align=center| 3
| align=center| 5:00
| London, England
| 
|-
| Win
| align=center| 19–7–1
| Jesse Lennox
| Technical Submission (triangle choke)
| UFC 115
| 
| align=center| 3
| align=center| 4:44
| Vancouver, British Columbia, Canada
| 
|-
| Loss
| align=center| 18–7–1
| Jake Ellenberger
| TKO (punches)
| UFC 108
| 
| align=center| 2
| align=center| 0:22
| Las Vegas, Nevada, United States
| 
|-
| Win
| align=center| 18–6–1
| Chris Wilson
| Submission (guillotine choke)
| UFC Fight Night: Diaz vs. Guillard
| 
| align=center| 3
| align=center| 2:15
| Oklahoma City, Oklahoma, United States
| 
|-
| Loss
| align=center| 17–6–1
| Brock Larson
| Submission (arm-triangle choke)
| UFC 98
| 
| align=center| 1
| align=center| 3:06
| Las Vegas, Nevada, United States
| 
|-
| Win
| align=center| 17–5–1
| Brian Gassaway
| Submission (armbar)
| SuperFights MMA: Night of Combat 2
| 
| align=center| 1
| align=center| 4:21
| Las Vegas, Nevada, United States
| 
|-
| Win
| align=center| 16–5–1
| J.J. Ambrose
| Submission (rear-naked choke)
| Affliction: Banned
| 
| align=center| 1
| align=center| 2:51
| Anaheim, California, United States
| 
|-
| Win
| align=center| 15–5–1
| Dan Hornbuckle
| Submission (triangle choke)
| World Victory Road Presents: Sengoku 2
| 
| align=center| 1
| align=center| 4:52
| Tokyo, Japan
| 
|-
| Win
| align=center| 14–5–1
| Damir Mirenic
| Submission (kimura)
| HCF: Destiny
| 
| align=center| 2
| align=center| 1:24
| Calgary, Alberta, Canada
| 
|-
| Loss
| align=center| 13–5–1
| Jake Shields
| Submission (rear-naked choke)
| EliteXC: Renegade
| 
| align=center| 1
| align=center| 3:39
| Corpus Christi, Texas, United States
| 
|-
| Win
| align=center| 13–4–1
| Aaron Wetherspoon
| Decision (unanimous)
| Strikeforce: Shamrock vs. Baroni
| 
| align=center| 3
| align=center| 5:00
| San Jose, California, United States
| 
|-
| Win
| align=center| 12–4–1
| Ross Ebañez
| Submission (rear-naked choke)
| EliteXC: Destiny
| 
| align=center| 1
| align=center| 1:55
| Southaven, Mississippi, United States
| 
|-
| Loss
| align=center| 11–4–1
| Matt Horwich
| Submission (rear-naked choke)
| IFL: World Championship Semifinals
| 
| align=center| 2
| align=center| 1:02
| Portland, Oregon, United States
| 
|-
| Win
| align=center| 11–3–1
| John Cole
| Technical Submission (guillotine choke)
| IFL: Portland
| 
| align=center| 1
| align=center| 0:17
| Portland, Oregon, United States
| 
|-
| Loss
| align=center| 10–3–1
| Rory Markham
| KO (punch)
| IFL: Legends Championship 2006
| 
| align=center| 1
| align=center| 0:44
| Atlantic City, New Jersey, United States
| 
|-
| Win
| align=center| 10–2–1
| Gustavo Machado
| TKO (punches)
| GFC: Team Gracie vs. Team Hammer House
| 
| align=center| 1
| align=center| 1:20
| Columbus, Ohio, United States
| 
|-
| Win
| align=center| 9–2–1
| Shonie Carter
| Submission (triangle choke)
| WEC 18
| 
| align=center| 1
| align=center| 2:06
| Lemoore, California, United States
| 
|-
| Win
| align=center| 8–2–1
| Bret Bergmark
| Submission (triangle choke)
| WEC 17
| 
| align=center| 1
| align=center| 3:36
| Lemoore, California, United States
| 
|-
| Win
| align=center| 7–2–1
| Tony Sanza
| Submission (rear-naked choke)
| SportFight 12
| 
| align=center| 1
| align=center| 1:06
| Portland, Oregon, United States
| 
|-
| Win
| align=center| 6–2–1
| Damian Hatch
| Submission (rear-naked choke)
| SportFight 10
| 
| align=center| 1
| align=center| 2:07
| Gresham, Oregon, United States
| 
|-
| Win
| align=center| 5–2–1
| Patrick Suhl
| KO (punches)
| Viking Fight 5
| 
| align=center| 1
| align=center| 1:31
| Copenhagen, Denmark
|
|-
| Win
| align=center| 4–2–1
| Petras Markevicius
| Submission (triangle choke)
| Viking Fight 5
| 
| align=center| 2
| align=center| 0:55
| Copenhagen, Denmark
|
|-
| Win
| align=center| 3–2–1
| Arschak Dahabagian
| Submission (triangle choke)
| Viking Fight 4
| 
| align=center| 2
| align=center| 3:39
| Copenhagen, Denmark
| 
|-
| Loss
| align=center| 2–2–1
| Valdas Pocevicius
| Submission (guillotine choke)
| Shooto
| 
| align=center| 1
| align=center| 3:37
| Vilnius, Lithuania
| 
|-
| Draw
| align=center| 2–1–1
| Andrei Semenov
| Draw
| M-1 MFC: Russia vs. the World 5
| 
| align=center| 1
| align=center| 10:00
| St. Petersburg, Russia
| 
|-
| Win
| align=center| 2–1
| Daan Kooiman
| Submission (rear-naked choke)
| Viking Fight 3
| 
| align=center| 1
| align=center| 0:49
| Aarhus, Denmark
| 
|-
| Win
| align=center| 1–1
| Jon Fitch
| Submission (rear-naked choke)
| Revolution Fighting Championship 1
| 
| align=center| 1
| align=center| 2:35
| Las Vegas, Nevada, United States
| 
|-
| Loss
| align=center| 0–1
| Quinton Jackson
| Decision (unanimous)
| ISCF: Memphis
| 
| align=center| 3
| align=center| 5:00
| Memphis, Tennessee, United States
|

See also

 List of WEC champions
 List of current UFC fighters
 List of male mixed martial artists

References

External links

Official UFC Profile

UFC 115 Interview: Mike "Quicksand" Pyle looking to sink Jesse Lennox

American male mixed martial artists
Welterweight mixed martial artists
Mixed martial artists utilizing taekwondo
Mixed martial artists utilizing Brazilian jiu-jitsu
World Extreme Cagefighting champions
Living people
People from Dresden, Tennessee
Mixed martial artists from Tennessee
1975 births
American male taekwondo practitioners
American practitioners of Brazilian jiu-jitsu
People awarded a black belt in Brazilian jiu-jitsu
Ultimate Fighting Championship male fighters